Quero Vas is a comune (municipality) in the Province of Belluno in the Italian region Veneto.

It was established on 28 December 2013 by the merger of the municipalities of Quero and Vas.

References

Cities and towns in Veneto